Verónica Sánchez Calderón (born 1 July 1977) is a Spanish actress. She made her debut in theatre in 1996, and came to media attention as Eva Capdevila in the Telecinco series Los Serrano in 2003. Sánchez has since developed a successful film career.

Early life 
Sánchez was born on 1 July 1977 in Seville. After taking the COU, she moved to Madrid to train in drama.

Career 
Sánchez made her stage debut in 1996. One of her most successful theater shows was Blood Wedding in 2002.

In 2003, after starring in Fernando Colomo's film Al sur de Granada, Sánchez landed the role of Eva Capdevila in the television series Los Serrano. Eva's incestuous relationship with her stepbrother Marcos (Fran Perea) earned Sánchez great popularity in Spain. She left Los Serrano in 2006. Sánchez starred in the first season of the television series Génesis: en la mente del asesino, not returning for the second season.

She performed in films such sa Camarón, El Calentito, Mia Sarah, Los 2 lados de la cama, 13 Roses and Zenitram.

Filmography 
Film

Television

Theatre roles 
 Un espíritu burlón de Noel Coward (1996)
 Tierra (1997)
 Lorca e Escena (1998)
 El Zapatito Mágico (1999)
 Fin (1999)
 Don Juan en los ruedos de Salvador Távora (2001)
 Bodas de sangre (2002)

Awards and nominations

References

External links 
 

1977 births
Living people
People from Seville
21st-century Spanish actresses
Actresses from Andalusia
Spanish female models
Spanish film actresses
Spanish stage actresses
Spanish television actresses